The 2006-07 season was Klubi i Futbollit Tirana's 68th competitive season, 68th consecutive season in the Kategoria Superiore and 86th year in existence as a football club.

Squad

Competitions

Albanian Supercup

Kategoria Superiore

League table

Results summary

Results by round

UEFA Cup

Qualifying phase

First qualifying round

Second qualifying round

References 

KF Tirana seasons
Tirana
Albanian football championship-winning seasons